Allan Drash was a pediatric endocrinologist and former president of the American Diabetes Association and was the second president of ISGD (now the International Society for Pediatric and Adolescent Diabetes for two terms from 1981-1984-1987.  He was one of the original describers of the Denys-Drash syndrome.

Publications

Honors and awards
 2006 ISPAD Prize of Achievement

Legacy
 Allan Drash Fellowship. Starting in 2006, International Society for Pediatric and Adolescent Diabetes has been awarding an annual 6 week clinical fellowship for applicants below 45 years in his name.

References

1931 births
2009 deaths
American pediatric endocrinologists
Vanderbilt University alumni
University of Virginia School of Medicine alumni